Dublin Rathmines West was a parliamentary constituency represented in Dáil Éireann, the lower house of the Irish parliament or Oireachtas from 1977 to 1981. The constituency elected 3 deputies (Teachtaí Dála, commonly known as TDs) to the Dáil, using proportional representation by means of the single transferable vote (PR-STV).

History 
The constituency was used at the 1977 general election, under the Electoral (Amendment) Act 1974, largely with territory transferred from Dublin South-Central, as part of the redistribution of constituencies which attempted to secure the re-election of the outgoing Fine Gael–Labour Party government.

The constituency was abolished under the Electoral (Amendment) Act 1980, which came into effect at the 1981 general election. It was mostly transferred to Dublin South-Central although a smaller part went to Dublin South-East.

Its election was notable as the first time that Mary Robinson (later 8th President of Ireland), stood for the Dáil, though she was unsuccessful.

Boundaries 
The constituency covered the Rathmines district of South-East Dublin and adjoining areas. It consisted of the following wards of the county borough of Dublin: Crumlin D, Kimmage A, Kimmage B, Kimmage C, Kimmage D, Kimmage E, Rathfarnham A, Rathmines West A, Rathmines West B, Rathmines West D, Rathmines West E, Rathmines West F, Terenure A, Terenure B, Terenure C.

TDs

1977 general election

See also 
Dáil constituencies
Politics of the Republic of Ireland
Historic Dáil constituencies
Elections in the Republic of Ireland

References

External links 
Oireachtas Members Database

Dáil constituencies in County Dublin (historic)
Rathmines
1977 establishments in Ireland
1981 disestablishments in Ireland
Constituencies established in 1977
Constituencies disestablished in 1981